Liberta Sports Club is an Antiguan and Barbudan multi-sports club located in Liberta, Antigua and Barbuda. The club was founded in 1991.

Teams

Cricket 
The sports club sponsors a cricket team.

Football 
The sports club sponsors a football team. The team plays at the Antigua Recreation Ground in St. John's. The team won the 2018–19 Antigua and Barbuda Premier Division, making it their first league championship, and earning a berth into the 2020 Caribbean Club Shield.

Notable players 

 Taj Charles

References

External links 
 Official website

Cricket teams in Antigua and Barbuda
Football clubs in Antigua and Barbuda
1991 establishments in Antigua and Barbuda